Per Berle Thomsen (17 August 1905 – 22 October 1983) was a Norwegian journalist and newspaper editor.

He was born in Bergen.

Thomsen was a journalist for Stavanger Aftenblad from 1926 to 1941. He was editor-in-chief for Stavanger Aftenblad from 1955 to 1973.

From November 1944 to May 1945 he was incarcerated in the Grini concentration camp.

Selected works
På Tomannsfot (1932) 
Med kikkert på magen (1933) 
Tomannsbu (1934) 
Hypp, all mine hester (1935)

References

1905 births
1983 deaths
Journalists from Bergen
Norwegian newspaper editors
Norwegian nature writers
Grini concentration camp survivors
20th-century Norwegian writers